The 1916 Clemson Tigers football team represented Clemson Agricultural College—now known as Clemson University—as a member of the Southern Intercollegiate Athletic Association (SIAA) during the 1916 college football season. Led by Wayne Hart in his first and only season as head coach, the Tigers compiled an overall record of 3–6 with a mark of 2–4 in SIAA play. S. S. Major was the team captain.

Stumpy Banks caught two touchdowns against rival South Carolina.

Schedule

References

Clemson
Clemson Tigers football seasons
Clemson Tigers football